Cynosure is the second full-length album by the power metal/progressive metal band by Viathyn. It was released physically and digitally in 2014.

Track listing

Personnel
Tomislav Crnkovic – vocals, guitars
David Crnkovic – drums
Jacob Wright – guitars
Alex Kot – bass

Session musicians 
 Sean Jenkins - guest harsh vocals

Technical staff 
 Sacha Laskow - mastering

References

External links
 https://viathyn.bandcamp.com/album/cynosure

2014 albums